Wilhelmina Tokcumboh "Mina" Smallman (born 29 October 1956) is a British retired Anglican priest and former school teacher. She served as the Archdeacon of Southend in the Diocese of Chelmsford from September 2013 until her retirement in December 2016. She was the Church of England's first female archdeacon from a black and minority ethnic background.

Early life
Smallman was born on 29 October 1956 in Middlesex. Her mother Catherine was of Scottish descent and her father Bill was of Nigerian heritage.

Career
During her whole career she says she suffered misogyny and racism, mainly due to privileged white men questioning her right to be where she was.

Teaching
Smallman studied Drama, English and Voice at the Central School of Speech and Drama, graduating with a Bachelor of Education (BEd) degree in 1988. She then worked as a drama teacher for 15 years. By 2005, she was an assistant principal of John Kelly Girls' Technology College.

Ordained ministry
Smallman trained for ordination on the North Thames Ministerial Training Course. During her training, she also studied contextual theology at Middlesex University, graduating with a Bachelor of Arts (BA) degree in 2006.

Smallman was ordained in the Church of England as a deacon in 2006 and as a priest in 2007. After curacies in Harrow and Stanmore she was Team Vicar in Barking from 2010 until her Archdeacon’s appointment.

In June 2013, it was announced that Smallman would be the next Archdeacon of Southend. On 16 September 2013, she was installed as archdeacon during at a service at Chelmsford Cathedral. She retired on 31 December 2016.

In 2021 she was chosen by BBC Radio 4's Today programme to be one of seven guest editors during the Christmas period.

Personal life
Smallman had three daughters. Since 1992, she has been married to Christopher.

The bodies of two of Smallman's daughters, Nicole Smallman and Bibaa Henry, were discovered, stabbed to death, in Fryent Country Park, Brent on 7 June 2020. Mina Smallman maintains the police did not do enough to find the missing sisters early on and maintains there was a racist element in this.  An inquiry by the Independent Office for Police Conduct made some criticisms of the investigation but considered that there was no element of racism involved.

A murder investigation was launched. On 2 July 2020, Danyal Hussein was charged with murdering Smallman and Henry. He was found guilty on 6 July 2021 and sentenced to life imprisonment with a minimum term of 35 years.

Smallman maintains that most police are amazing people who do an amazing job but there is an influential misogynistic minority and we need to work to overcome this.  Smallman maintains Cressida Dick tried to mislead her.  Smallman maintains Dick gave the impression problems with investigation of her daughters' murders were unusual and isolated incidents when, in reality Dick knew about investigations of wrong doing at Charing Cross Police Station and knew there were larger problems.  Smallman said, "So she would have known that this wasn't an isolated incident. I didn't expect her to throw herself or the Met under the bus, but to behave in a way that sounds as though 'this is incredible', or 'we've never heard of anything like this in our lives' [the conduct of the officers in Fryent Country Park], it was a lie."

Honours 
Smallman was included in the BBC's 100 Women list for 2021, which honours the most inspiring and influential women from around the world. In 2021, the BBC were concerned to highlight women who are hitting 'reset' - women who are reinventing our society, our culture, and our world. Smallman was recognised for her trailblazing as the first female Church of England archdeacon from a black or ethnic-minority background, and for her campaigning to make UK streets safer and to reform the police. This follows the murder of her daughters Nicole Smallman and Bibaa Henry in 2020.

References

External links
 Tributes from the Smallman and Henry families

1956 births
Alumni of the Royal Central School of Speech and Drama
Alumni of Middlesex University
Archdeacons of Southend
British people of Nigerian descent
Living people
BBC 100 Women